The Padma mine is one of the largest vanadium mines in Russia.  The mine is located in Republic of Karelia. The mine has reserves amounting to 4.6 million tonnes of ore grading 2.35% vanadium.

See also 
 List of mines in Russia

References 

Vanadium mines in Russia